Maiocco is a surname. Notable people with the surname include:

Hugo Maiocco (1927–2017), American sprinter
Luigi Maiocco (1892–1965), Italian gymnast
Matt Maiocco (born 1967), American sportswriter
Pia Maiocco (born 1962), American bass guitarist and singer